ITU Turkish Music State Conservatory was founded in 1975 and is located on ITU's Macka campus, Istanbul.

Notable alumni 

 Ziynet Sali
 Volkan Konak
 Funda Arar

References

External links 
 ITU Turkish Music State Conservatory, official website

Istanbul Technical University
Educational institutions established in 1975
1975 establishments in Turkey
Music schools in Turkey